Paul Edward Siebert (born June 5, 1953) is a former Major League Baseball pitcher. Paul's father was former major league first baseman Dick Siebert.

The Houston Astros drafted Siebert in the third round of the 1971 Major League Baseball Draft (58th overall, 7 ahead of Ron Guidry) out of Edina High School in Edina, Minnesota. He started in his major league debut on September 7 against the San Diego Padres, and exited after seven strong innings with a 4-2 lead the bullpen was unable to hold. In his next start, he shutout the San Francisco Giants on four hits. Siebert would not, however, win another game with the Astros. He would not make it out of the second inning in either of his next two starts (losing one), and went 0-2 each of the two following seasons. Just as pitchers and catchers were set to report for Spring training , Siebert was dealt to the Padres for a minor league pitcher.

Siebert began the 1977 season with the triple A Hawaii Islanders, and was up in the majors for less than two weeks when he was part of the infamous "Saturday Night Massacre" in New York. On June 15, 1977, the Mets traded Dave Kingman to the San Diego Padres for Siebert and Bobby Valentine, sent Tom Seaver to the Cincinnati Reds for Pat Zachry, Doug Flynn, Steve Henderson and Dan Norman, and Mike Phillips to the St. Louis Cardinals for Joel Youngblood.

Siebert split the rest of that year between the Mets and the minor league Tidewater Tides. He was the winning pitcher and scored the winning run in the Mets' seventeen inning extra innings marathon against the Montreal Expos on July 9. Coincidentally, his only other win and final career win also came in extra innings against the Los Angeles Dodgers. He would also split the  season between the Mets and Tidewater, going 0-2 with a 5.14 ERA at the major league level.

Siebert was traded to the St. Louis Cardinals for outfielder Bob Coluccio after the 1978 season, but neither would see any major league experience with his new club. Siebert was released at the end of Spring training . Shortly afterwards, he signed with the Montreal Expos, going 1-3 with a 5.25 ERA for the Denver Bears of the American Association before retiring.

See also
List of second-generation Major League Baseball players

References

External links

, or The Ultimate Mets Database

1953 births
Living people
Baseball players from Minneapolis
Cocoa Astros players
Columbus Astros players
Covington Astros players
Denver Bears players
Hawaii Islanders players
Houston Astros players
Iowa Oaks players
Major League Baseball pitchers
Memphis Blues players
New York Mets players
Orlando Juice players
San Diego Padres players
Tiburones de La Guaira players
American expatriate baseball players in Venezuela
Tidewater Tides players
Edina High School alumni